George Gilbody (born 1 January 1955) is a British boxer. He competed in the men's lightweight event at the 1980 Summer Olympics.

Gilbody was the National Champion in 1974 after winning the prestigious ABA featherweight title, he was also four times National Champion in the lightweight division (1977, 1979, 1980, 1981) boxing out of St. Helens Star ABC. He also represented England in the 60 kg lightweight division, at the 1978 Commonwealth Games in Edmonton, Alberta, Canada.

References

1955 births
Living people
British male boxers
Olympic boxers of Great Britain
Boxers at the 1980 Summer Olympics
Sportspeople from Southport
Boxers at the 1978 Commonwealth Games
Lightweight boxers
Commonwealth Games competitors for England